The men's 100 metre freestyle event at the 2014 Commonwealth Games as part of the swimming programme took place on 26 and 27 July at the Tollcross International Swimming Centre in Glasgow, Scotland.

The medals were presented by Cliff Williams, Secretary General of The Antigua and Barbuda Olympic Association and the quaichs were presented by Steve Montgomery, Managing Director of First ScotRail.

Records
Prior to this competition, the existing world and Commonwealth Games records were as follows.

Results

Heats

Semifinals

Final

References

External links

Men's 0100 metre freestyle
Commonwealth Games